In Ohio, State Route 68 may refer to:
U.S. Route 68 in Ohio, the only Ohio highway numbered 68 since about 1933
Ohio State Route 68 (1923), now SR 47

68